Now Khandan (also romanized as Nowkhandān and Nau Khāndān) is a city and capital of Now Khandan District, in Dargaz County, Razavi Khorasan Province, Iran. At the 2006 census, its population was 2,751, in 774 families.

References 

Populated places in Dargaz County
Cities in Razavi Khorasan Province